Leigh Tudor (born 25 September 1969) is a former Australian rules footballer who played for North Melbourne and Geelong football clubs and is currently an assistant coach for the North Melbourne Football Club in the Australian Football League (AFL). He was formerly an assistant coach for the Sydney Swans.

AFL career
Tudor was used mostly as a half forward during his career, which started at North Melbourne in 1989. He played only eight games in four years with North Melbourne and was traded to Geelong in the 1992 AFL Draft.

A regular in the Geelong team, Tudor played in back to back grand finals in 1994 and 1995 but finished on the losing side on both occasions. In a game against Richmond at the MCG in the 1995 season he kicked a career best five goals.

Tudor coached Geelong to the Victorian Football League (VFL) premiership in 2007. In 2010 Tudor became an assistant coach at AFL club St Kilda. On 10 October 2013, he was appointed a senior assistant coach for the North Melbourne Football Club. He began his Development Role at Essendon commencing from the 2020 AFL season and was coach of Essendon's reserves team in the Victorian Football League in 2021.

References

External links

Further reading

 Holmesby, Russell and Main, Jim (2007). The Encyclopedia of AFL Footballers, 7th ed. Melbourne: Bas Publishing.

1969 births
Living people
Australian rules footballers from Victoria (Australia)
Geelong Football Club players
North Melbourne Football Club players
Doutta Stars Football Club players